Tumacácori National Historical Park is located in the upper Santa Cruz River Valley in Santa Cruz County, southern Arizona. The park protects the ruins of three Spanish mission communities, two of which are National Historic Landmark sites. It also contains the landmark 1937 Tumacácori Museum building, also a National Historic Landmark.

History

The first Spanish Colonial Jesuit missions in the locale were established in 1691, Mission San Cayetano de Tumacácori (at Tumacácori) and Mission Los Santos Ángeles de Guevavi, are the two oldest missions in southern Arizona. The Franciscan church of Mission San José de Tumacácori, across the river from and replacing Mission San Cayetano de Tumacácori, was built in the 1750s.  The third mission was established in 1756, Mission San Cayetano de Calabazas.

The Mission San José de Tumacácori complex is open to the public. Nearby are the park's visitor center and the Tumacácori Museum in a historic Mission Revival style building. The Guevavi and Calabazas missions are not open to the general public, but can be visited on reserved tours led by park staff.

The Tumacácori missions complex was originally protected as Tumacácori National Monument, in 1908 by President Theodore Roosevelt. It was listed on the National Register of Historic Places on October 15, 1966.  In 1990 the national monument was redesignated a National Historical Park. The Guevavi and Calabazas mission units were  added to the Tumacácori missions complex unit, within the new Tumacácori National Historical Park.

The site was on the route of the 1775–1776 Juan Bautista de Anza Expedition from New Spain to Alta California, the first Spanish overland expedition to claimed but un-colonized upper Las Californias territory. A  segment of the Juan Bautista de Anza National Historic Trail lies along the Santa Cruz River between Tumacácori National Historical Park and Tubac Presidio State Historic Park.

Mission San José de Tumacácori

Mission San José de Tumacácori was established in 1691 by Jesuit padre Eusebio Kino in a different nearby location. It was established one day before Mission Los Santos Ángeles de Guevavi, making it the oldest Jesuit mission site in southern Arizona. The first mission was named Mission San Cayetano de Tumacácori, established at an existing native O'odham or Sobaipuri settlement on the east side of the Santa Cruz River.

After the Pima rebellion of 1751, the mission was moved to the present site on the west side of the Santa Cruz River and renamed San José de Tumacácori. By 1848, the mission was abandoned and began falling into severe disrepair. In 1854 it became a part of the U.S. Arizona Territory, after the Gadsden Purchase.

Restoration and stabilization efforts began in 1908 when the site was declared Tumacácori National Monument by President Theodore Roosevelt. In 1990 it became part of the new Tumacácori National Historical Park.

Tumacácori Museum 

Tumacácori Museum was built in 1937 within what was then Tumacácori National Monument and is now Tumacácori National Historical Park.  Designed by Scofield Delong, it contains interpretative displays relating to three historic missions preserved within the park, and includes artwork created by artist Herbert A. Collins.

The museum building, a fine example of Mission Revival style architecture, with Spanish Colonial Revival details, was declared a National Historic Landmark in 1987.

Cinema
Movies with scenes filmed in the park include:
 Duel in the Sun directed by King Vidor (1946)
 Young Guns II directed by Geoff Murphy (1990)
 Boys on the Side directed by Herbert Ross (1995)

See also
 Spanish missions in Arizona
 Spanish missions in the Sonoran Desert
 Hispanic Heritage Site

References

External links 
 
 
 
 

 
National Historical Parks of the United States
Spanish missions in Arizona
National Park Service areas in Arizona
History museums in Arizona
Museums in Santa Cruz County, Arizona
Parks in Santa Cruz County, Arizona
National Historic Landmarks in Arizona
Buildings and structures on the National Register of Historic Places in Arizona
National Register of Historic Places in Santa Cruz County, Arizona
1990 establishments in Arizona
Protected areas established in 1990
Archaeological sites in Arizona
Mission Revival architecture in Arizona
Spanish Colonial architecture in Arizona
Spanish Colonial Revival architecture in Arizona
Historic American Buildings Survey in Arizona
Parks on the National Register of Historic Places in Arizona
Museums on the National Register of Historic Places 
Historic districts on the National Register of Historic Places in Arizona
National Park Service rustic in Arizona